Die Bräutigamswitwe ( The Bridegroom's Widow) is a 1931 German comedy film directed by Richard Eichberg. It starred Mártha Eggerth, Georg Alexander, and Fritz Kampers. It is the German-language version of the British film Let's Love and Laugh which was made simultaneously. It was based upon the play, Unwelcome Wife, written by Edward A. Paulton and Fred Thompson. It tells the story of two philanderers who marry each other.

Cast

References

External links
 

Films of the Weimar Republic
1931 films
1930s German-language films
Films directed by Richard Eichberg
1931 musical comedy films
German musical comedy films
German multilingual films
German black-and-white films
1931 multilingual films
1930s German films